Thomas Joseph Nicolson (1645–1718) was a Roman Catholic bishop who served as the Vicar Apostolic of Scotland.

Life

He was born the son of Thomas Nicolsone, merchant, and his wife, Elizabeth Abercrombie of Birkenbog. His older brother was Sir George Nicolson, Lord Kemnay.

Born in Birkenbog, Banffshire in 1645, he was converted to the Roman Catholic Church in 1682. He was ordained a priest on 9 March 1686. He was appointed the Vicar Apostolic of Scotland and Titular Bishop of Peristasis by the Holy See on 7 September 1694. He was consecrated to the Episcopate in Paris on 27 February 1695. The principal consecrator was Bishop Jules Mascaron of Agen, and the principal co-consecrators were Bishop Henri de Barillon of Luçon and Bishop Martin de Ratabon of Ypres. He died in office on 12 October 1718, aged 73.

References

1645 births
1718 deaths
Apostolic vicars of Scotland
18th-century Roman Catholic bishops in Scotland
People from Banffshire
17th-century Roman Catholic bishops in Scotland
Converts to Roman Catholicism
Scottish Roman Catholic bishops